Vitim is the name of several inhabited localities in Russia.

Modern localities
Vitim, Sakha Republic, an urban locality (an urban-type settlement) in Lensky District of the Sakha Republic
Vitim, Republic of Buryatia, a rural locality (a settlement) in Muysky Selsoviet of Muysky District in the Republic of Buryatia;

Alternative names
Vitim, alternative name of Romanovka, a selo in Vitimsky Selsoviet of Bauntovsky District in the Republic of Buryatia;